Stephen David Conway SCP (born 22 December 1957) is a British Anglican bishop. Since December 2010, he has been the Bishop of Ely; and since 2022, the Acting Bishop of Lincoln. From 2006 to 2010, he was the Bishop of Ramsbury, an area bishop (before 2009) and then suffragan bishop of the Diocese of Salisbury.

Early life and education
Conway was born on 22 December 1957. He was educated at Archbishop Tenison's Grammar School, a state grammar school in Lambeth, London. He studied modern history at Keble College, Oxford, graduating with a Bachelor of Arts (BA) degree; as per tradition, his BA was promoted to a Master of Arts (MA Oxon).

Conway remained at Keble College to undertake teacher training, and he completed a Postgraduate Certificate in Education (PGCE) in 1981. He then became a teacher, working as an assistant master at Glenalmond College, a private school in Perth, Scotland, between 1981 and 1983.

In 1983, Conway started at Westcott House, Cambridge, an Anglican theological college in the Liberal Catholic tradition, to train for ordained ministry. During this time he also matriculated, studying theology, at Selwyn College, Cambridge, and he graduated with a further Bachelor of Arts (BA) degree in 1985. After a further year of training, he left theological college in 1986 to be ordained in the Church of England.

Ordained ministry
Conway was made a deacon at Petertide 1986 (29 June) by Michael Ball, Bishop of Jarrow, and ordained a priest the following Petertide (28 June 1987) by David Jenkins, Bishop of Durham — both times at Durham Cathedral. From 1986 to 1989, he served his curacy at St Mary's Church, Heworth in the Diocese of Durham. He was an assistant curate at Church of St Michael and All Angels, Bishopwearmouth, Sunderland, between 1989 and 1990, and then an honorary curate of St Margaret's Church, Durham, between 1990 and 1994. From 1989 to 1994, he was also Director of Ordinands for the Diocese of Durham. He then moved to St Mary's Church, Cockerton, Darlington, where he was Priest-in-Charge from 1994 to 1996 and Vicar from 1996 to 1998.

From here he became senior chaplain to Michael Turnbull, Bishop of Durham; and subsequently Archdeacon of Durham.

Episcopal ministry
On 2 May 2006, his nomination as Bishop of Ramsbury was announced, and he was consecrated on 22 June 2006. He was the last area bishop under that diocese's 1981–2009 area scheme. Following the retirement of David Stancliffe as Bishop of Salisbury in July 2010, Conway was made responsible for the administration of that diocese. On 31 August 2010, it was announced that he would be the next Bishop of Ely. He was elected by the College of Canons at Ely on 18 October 2010, and the election was confirmed by the provincial court on 6 December 2010, at which point he legally became the Bishop of Ely. His installation and enthronement was held in Ely Cathedral on 5 March 2011.

From 2011-15 Conway was the inaugural Chair of Development and Appointments Group of the House of Bishops. He oversaw the development of initially disputed leadership training for bishops and deans and the creation of the Senior Leadership Development Programme for identified and screened clergy who might grow into strategic ministries. This is now mainstream. He has also contributed to the initial leadership training of members of the judiciary from new district judges and coroners to justices of appeal. He has engaged in various leadership courses with the Windsor Leadership Trust and was a keynote speaker at a WLT leadership programme at Cumberland Lodge in 2020.

When Conway entered the House of Lords in 2014 he became the national lead bishop for education and Chair of the National Society for England and Wales, the Church's education arm since 1811. He brought forward the Church's new vision for education in partnership with the Chief Education Officer, the Rev'd Nigel Genders. He promoted partnership with Her Majesty's Government in primary, secondary and tertiary education and sought a closer relationship with diocesan directors of education and headteachers around the country. He travelled widely around the country to encourage church schools in their offer of high-quality holistic education. He promoted character and virtue education in the House of Lords and through other public networks.

This was honoured by his being made a Farmington Education Fellow in Oxford on sabbatical in 2017. Later that year he was elected an honorary fellow of Harris Manchester College at the University of Oxford.

He is also the Visitor of Jesus, Peterhouse and St John's Colleges in the University of Cambridge and of the King's School Ely.

Conway is President of Cambridgeshire ACRE, the rural development trust for Cambridgeshire. For three years from 2017, he was President of the East of England Agricultural Society and is the Patron of Marshal Papworth Trust which supports students from the Global World studying development in agriculture and agribusiness.

He is an active patron of the Arthur Rank Hospice serving Cambridgeshire with both residential and home palliative care.

Since 2011, Conway had been the Anglican bishop accompanying the L'Arche Community of disabled adults with their carers in the UK. Since 2014 he has been a member of the church leaders' advisory group of L'Arche International worldwide. From 2001 - 2010 Conway was a trustee and chair of Mental Health Matters, a third sector national provider of mental health services which had begun in the North East of England as a schizophrenia charity.

From 2015-18 Conway was a member of the Faith and Order Commission of the World Council of Churches.

From 2020-21 Conway was part of a small group appointed by the Archbishops of Canterbury and York to consult all serving bishops about culture change and diocesan structural development. Their report was submitted in April 2021, including a substantial essay on the theology of the episcopate written by Conway. He is now a member of the ongoing bishops' reference group.

In accordance with constitutional practice, upon becoming the twenty-sixth most senior bishop in the Church of England (after the Archbishop of Canterbury, the Archbishop of York, the Bishops of London, Durham and Winchester, and the nineteen other longest serving Bishops), Conway became one of the Lords Spiritual of the House of Lords on 4 June 2014. He was introduced to the House on Monday, 7 July 2014.

It has been announced that Conway is to serve as both Bishop of Ely and Acting Bishop of Lincoln (each half-time) throughout 2022.

Styles
The Reverend Stephen Conway (1986–2002)
The Venerable Stephen Conway (2002–2006)
The Right Reverend Stephen Conway (2006–present)

References

External links

1957 births
People educated at Archbishop Tenison's Church of England School, Lambeth
Alumni of Keble College, Oxford
Alumni of Selwyn College, Cambridge
Archdeacons of Durham
21st-century Church of England bishops
Living people
Bishops of Ramsbury
Bishops of Ely
Lords Spiritual
Alumni of Westcott House, Cambridge